Rexis is an unincorporated community in Indiana County, Pennsylvania, United States. The community is located at the Cambria County line across from Vintondale, near the confluence of the two branches of Blacklick Creek.

References

Unincorporated communities in Indiana County, Pennsylvania
Unincorporated communities in Pennsylvania